Pseudophorellia is a genus of tephritid  or fruit flies in the family Tephritidae.

References

Trypetinae
Tephritidae genera